The Orellan North American Stage on the geologic timescale is the North American faunal stage according to the North American Land Mammal Ages chronology (NALMA), 34-32 million years ago. It is usually considered to fall within the Early Oligocene. The Orellan precedes the Whitneyan and follows the Chadronian NALMA stages.

The Orellan is contained within the Rupelian and shares the lower boundary.

References

 
Oligocene life
Oligocene animals of North America